Staje is a settlement west of Ig in central Slovenia. The entire Municipality of Ig is part of the traditional region of Inner Carniola and is now included in the Central Slovenia Statistical Region.

References

External links

Staje on Geopedia

Populated places in the Municipality of Ig